The Tripuri (also known as TripuraTipra, Tiprasa, Twipra), are a Tibeto-Burmese ethnic group of Northeast Indian state of Tripura. They are the inhabitants of the Twipra/Tripura Kingdom in North-East India and Bangladesh. The Tripuri people through the Manikya dynasty ruled the Kingdom of Tripura for many years until the kingdom joined the Indian Union on 15 October 1949.

History

Tripuris are the native people of Tripura having its own unique and distinct rich culture, tradition, and history. They were able to expand their influence as far south as Chittagong Division, as far west as Comilla and Noakhali (known during the British period as 'plains Tipperah')and as far north as Sylhet Division (all in present Bangladesh). Chittagong Hill Tracts was the part of Tipperah Kingdom till British took control of the Indian subcontinent. In the year 1512, the Tipperas were at the height of their supremacy when they defeated the Mughals. The ruling dynasty passed through several periods of history and ruled Tripura for several centuries until the 18th century, after which Plain Tippera became a colony of Britain and Hill Tippera remained an Independent Princely state. On 14 October 1949, Hill Tippera was merged into the newly independent India as Tripura State.

Language

The Tripuri people speak Kokborok (also known as Tipra), a Tibeto-Burman language. Tripuri is the official language of Tripura, India. There are estimated to be more than one million speakers of the dialects of Tripuri in Tripura, and additional speakers in Mizoram and Assam in India, as well as Sylhet and the Chittagong Hill Tracts in Bangladesh. It is also spoken in Feni.

There are three main dialects of Tripuri, though the central dialect Debbarma (Puratan Tripur), is a dialect understood by everyone. It is the standard for teaching and literature. It is taught as the medium of instruction up to class fifth and as subject up to graduate level in Tripura.

Historically, Tripuri was written in native Tripuri script known as Koloma, the earliest known writing in Tripuri dates from the 1st century AD, and was written in Koloma. The script was replaced by an alphabet based on the Eastern Nagari script. Currently the revival of ancient Koloma script is in process.

Some of the most notable Tripuri historical literary works, written by court scholars, include:
 The "Rajratnakar", The royal Chronicle of Tripuri kings
 The Rajmala, Chronicle of Tripuri Kings of Tripura

Religion 

In the 2011 census, 93.6% of the Tripuri people followed an admixture of Hindu and folk religions and 6.4% were Christians (mostly, Baptists). Tripuri Hinduism is a syncretic religion, melding traditional folk religion with Hindu elements, commonly found in northeastern India. A minority of the Uchoi clan of the Tripuri are Buddhist.

Some Tripuris, chiefly in Bangladesh but also in India, have adopted Islam as their religion and have been subjected to violence by some Tripuri Christians. On 18 June 2021, a Tripuri imam and farmer called Omar Faruq Tripura (formerly known as Bennichand Tripura) of Tulajhiri Aga Tripurapara was shot whilst heading home from Isha prayers at a makeshift mosque. Five of the 38 families in this tripurapara are Muslim; the rest are Christian.

Kinship 
 
The main Tripuri clans are:
 Debbarma
 Tripura
 Jamatia
 Reang or Bru
 Noatia
 Koloi
 Murasing
  Rupini
 Uchoi/Usoi

The concept of Bangladeshi and Indian Tripuri Community is different. In Bangladesh, where Tripuri People are known as "Tripura Tribe" and In India, they are known as "Tripuri Tribe".

Society

The Tripuri people consist of clans, each with its own elementary social and administrative organisation starting from the village level and up to the chieftainship of the whole community.

These indigenous communities enjoy their traditional freedom based on the concept of self-determination. The relation between the king and the subject communities was as Maharaja (king) of Tripura-Missip or liaison officer Roy or headman of the community – Sardar the chief of the village – the individual. Earlier, only the Debbarma or Tipra ethnic group was included in the Tripuri Kshatriya group. Later, the Raja included other groups like Reang, Jamatia and Noatia as well, in an attempt to foster a sense of kindness among the people under his region.

The Tripuri people have a rich historical, social, and cultural heritage which is totally distinct from that of the mainland Indians. Their distinctive culture – as reflected in their dance, music, festivals, management of community affairs, dress and food habits – has a strong base. Kokborok, the lingua franca of the 12 largest linguistic groups of the indigenous Tripuris and other dialects spoken in Tripura are of the Tibeto-Burman group and distinct from those spoken in India. There is no influence from those spoken by other peoples in the north-eastern region.

Calendar

The Tripuris follow a traditional luni-solar calendar Tripurabda, which has 12 months and a 7-day week, like the Gregorian calendar.

The Tripura Era's New Year is on the 1st of Vaishakh which corresponds to 14 or 15 of April of Common_Era, depending on whether that year is a Leap year or not. The months are named in pan Indian months, time since its inception 1419 years back by Tripuri king Hamtor pha alias Himti pha alias Jujharu pha in 512 Saka Era.

Food
Tripuri people loves to eat different types of fresh vegetables from hill. In their food menu, Bamboo Shoots are one of the traditional dish which they call "Moya" or "Muya" in their Kokborok Language.

The use of dry fish is common in their daily cuisine. Sticky rice which is one of the traditional food of Tripuri People and they eat sticky rice in different ways including Awaan Bangwi/ Awaan Bwthai,Awaan Sokrang,Awaan Fanswi,Faaf ni Awaan and Awaan Belep

Eight Traditional Recipes or Cuisines which Tripuri People eat in their daily life.
 Gudok
 Chakhwi
 Bermabwtwi
 Mosideng
 Awandru
 Mwkhwikwtwi
 Serma
 Thokmwi

Awan Bangwi
Awan Bangwi which is one of the traditional food of Tripuri People. This cone shaped rice rolls in banana leaves for steam which is loved by Tripuris. Awan Bangwi which is a rice cake prepared by Tripuris including sticky rice,butter or Ghee, reisins, nuts, ginger and onion. Awan Bangwi is the national food of Tripura State.

Bamboo Chicken/Pork/Fish
Using Bamboo for cooking Chicken or Pork or Fish is popular and traditional way of cooking process of Tripuri People. The process is simple. Marinating chicken or pork or fish with different ingredients and stuff the chicken/pork/fish inside the bamboo with little water. Then cook it for 40-50 min on Charcoal. 

This Bamboo Chicken/Pork/Fish is widely popular among Tripuri People.

Festival

Buisu/Boisu/Bwisu

The Buisu
festival is the two long day festival of Tripuri People in India and Bangladesh. Buisu is also known as "Boisu" and "Bwisu" This Festival is the traditional New Year's Day which falls on 13 or 14 April.
Buisu Festival is close to link with Shifting or Jum Cultivation in Hill areas.

The Buisu Festival begins with Hari Buisu which is the first day. In Hari Buisu Tripuri People clean up their houses and decorated their houses with different flowers. They pray a special prayer in evening in their houses and temples. The next day is known as Buisu which is the main event where people visit each other house. During this main Buisu , peopele actually socialize with each other. People cook different traditional foods along with others.

Hangrai 
Hangrai which is one of the main festival of Tripuri People. This festival is very meaningful to Tripuri People which actually a harvest festival. The Tripuris celebrate Hangrai with a festive way. People start taking preparation of Hangrai which begins 4-5 days before.
Younger Generation make Nowshah or small huts made of bamboo and paddy husks. They gather for picnic where hot rice cakes and different food eat by them. Elders would remain at home and take shower early in the morning and wear fresh clothes. They gather around and share their Awangs , Moi or Curries and rice-based alcohol Arak or chuwak. They enjoy the entire day until midnight. 

In this festival Tripuri People visit holy places and worship of God and perform individual sacrifices and rituals.

Tripuri games and sports

Like many parts of the world the Tripuri has traditional sports. It is common in almost all the clans of Tripuri. They are called thwngmung in Tripuri.

Notable people

Bangladeshi
 Birendra Kishore Roaza Former Member of Parliament. 
 Sushanto Tripura, defender for the Bangladesh national football team
 Shobha Rani Tripura, Ekushey Padak recipient
 Jotindra Lal Tripura Former Member of Parliament.
 Kujendra Lal Tripura Politician , MP (Member of Parliament 299 Constituency)Khagrachari  Hill District.
 Naba Bikram Kishore Tripura Former Secretary, Former Additional Inspector General of Bangladesh Police 
 Mathura Bikash Tripura

Indian
 Bir Bikram Kishore Debbarman – 1908–1947, one of the last Kings of Tripura.
 Sachin Dev Burman – Bollywood composer and singer.
 Rahul Dev Burman – Bollywood composer and singer.
 Kirit Bikram Kishore Deb Barman- Late King
 Pradyot Bikram Manikya Deb Barma- Titular King and Current Head of Tripura Royal Family
 Bibhu Kumari Devi – Rajmata of Tripura
 Kanchan Prava Devi- Queen of Tripura.
 Radha Kishore Manikya- Maharaja of Tripura

 Birendra Kishore Manikya- Maharaja of Tripura
 Maha Manikya - Maharaja of Tripura
 Dharma Manikya I - Maharaja of Tripura
 Ratna Manikya I- Maharaja of Tripura
 Nabadwipchandra Dev Burman– Indian sitarist and Dhrupad singer

 Pratap Manikya- Maharaja of Tripura
 Sourabhee Debbarma – First female Indian idol winner, TV performer and singer.
 Riya Sen Dev Varma – Bollywood actress.
 Raima Sen Dev Varma – Bollywood actress.
 Somdev Devvarman – Indian tennis player.
 Narendra Chandra Debbarma-  Former Minister for Forests and Revenue, Govt of Tripura.
 Jishnu Dev Varma Politician,Deputy CM of Tripura.
 Dasarath Debbarma - Former Chief Minister of Tripura
 Aghore Debbarma-  Former Minister for Tribal Welfare,Agriculture & Animal Resource Development, Govt of Tripura.
 Jitendra Chaudhury- Former Minister for Forest and Industry, Commerce, Sports, Govt of Tripura.
 Rebati Tripura- Member of Parliament (India)
 Sudhanwa Debbarma- Former Speaker of Tripura Legislative Assembly
 Bidya Debbarma- Former Minister in Charge of Tribal Welfare, Govt of Tripura.
 Ranjit Debbarma- Command in General of All Tripura Tiger Force

 Nagendra Jamatia- Former Minister for Agriculture & Horticulture, Govt of Tripura. Former Legislator of Tripura Legislative Assembly
 Benichandra Jamatia – Padma Shri Indian folk writer and litterateur
 Mevar Kumar Jamatia Former Minister of Tribal Welfare and Forest, Tripura.
 Satyaram Reang – Padma Shri Indian folk performer and folk artist

 Harinath Debbarma-  Founder of TUJS
 Tanushree Deb Barma, The First Woman IAS Officer of Tripura.
 Nanda Kumar Deb Barma
 Manoranjan Debbarma Politician.
 Rashiram Debbarma - Former Minister of Ministry of Revenue, Govt of Tripura.
 Aghore Debbarma- Former Minister for Tribal Welfare,Agriculture & Animal Resource Development,Govt of Tripura.
 Padma Kumar Debbarma
 Jashabir Tripura
 Ramendra Narayan Debbarma
 Radhacharan Debbarma -Former CEM of TTAADC
 Purna Chandra Jamatia -CEM of TTAADC
 Naresh Jamatia - Former Minister of Forest, Rural Development and Election, Govt of Tripura.
 Brishaketu Debbarma
 Pranab Debbarma
 Harinath Debbarma - Founder of Tripura Upajati Juba Samiti
 Ramendra Narayan Debbarma
 Jagadish Debbarma- Chairman of TTAADC
 Pramod Reang
 Dhananjoy Tripura
 Shyama Charan Tripura
 Manindra Reang Former Minister for Tribal Welfare (TRP & PTG),Home (Jail) and GA (Printing and Stationery), Govt of Tripura.
 Dhirendra Debbarma
 Birendra Kishore Debbarma
 Burba Mohan Tripura
 Drao Kumar Riang
 Manoranjan Debbarma
 Gopi Nath Tripura
 Purna Mohan Tripura Former Minister of Finance&Power,Govt of Tripura.
 Kesab Debbarma
 Prem Kumar Reang Former Ministry of Fisheries,Co-Operation&Tribal Welfare(TRP&PTG), Govt of Tripura.
 Rajeswar Debbarma
 Parimal Debbarma
 Sindhu Chandra Jamatia
 Daniel Jamatia
 Nagendra Jamatia former Minister for Agriculture & Horticulture, Govt of Tripura.

See also
 Tipraland
 Tripuri culture
 Kokborok literature
 Tripuri nationalism
 Manikya Dynasty
 Tripuri calendar
 Tripura rebellion
 Buisu
 Ujjayanta Palace
 Neer Mahal

References

 
Scheduled Tribes of India
Ethnic groups in Bangladesh
Ethnic groups in Tripura
Ethnic groups in Northeast India
Ethnic groups in South Asia
Tripuri culture
Bodo-Kachari
Tripuri
Sino-Tibetan-speaking people
Hindu ethnic groups
Hindu communities